The bigfoot splayfoot salamander (Chiropterotriton magnipes), also known as the big-footed salamander, is a species of salamander in the family Plethodontidae. It is endemic to Mexico and only known from north-eastern Queretaro, at elevations of  asl.

Its natural habitats are caves and crevices in pine-oak forest. It has also been spotted in a tunnel under a church. It is threatened by habitat loss: removing the forest causes caves to dry up. The species has never been common.

References

Chiropterotriton
Cave salamanders
Endemic amphibians of Mexico
Amphibians described in 1965
Taxonomy articles created by Polbot
Fauna of the Sierra Madre Oriental